BBC Radio Durham was a BBC local radio station set up in 1968.

Background
BBC Radio Durham was part of the BBC's original plan to have nine sites where local radio experiments would be carried out. It is the only one of the original stations to have fully closed down.

It opened on 3 July 1968, but after the government restricted the BBC to twenty local radio stations, the corporation responded by ceasing transmissions on 25 August 1972. Its resources were transferred to Carlisle where BBC Radio Carlisle, now BBC Radio Cumbria, was formed.

It was the only one of the original stations to cover a county rather than a city. When the BBC opened Radio Newcastle which covered the north of the county and Radio Teesside (later Radio Cleveland and now BBC Tees) covered the south, it was sandwiched between the two. Although, in effect the radio station itself was moved to Carlisle to create the new service there.

County Durham is now covered by BBC Radio Newcastle and BBC Radio Tees.

Former BBC News correspondent Kate Adie worked at Radio Durham, before joining BBC Radio Bristol in 1970. Other presenters included Mike Hollingsworth, Eileen McCabe and Barbara Bailey.

References

Defunct BBC Local Radio stations
Radio stations established in 1968
1968 establishments in England
1972 disestablishments in England